The Fontana del Genio a Villa Giulia or Genio di Villa Giulia is a sculpted water fountain in the park of the Villa Giulia in Palermo. It was sculpted by Ignazio Marabitti in 1778 and shows the Genius of Palermo.

Genio Villa Giulia
Buildings and structures completed in 1778
18th-century architecture in Italy